The name Kai or Cai  has various origins and meanings in different cultures:
 In Estonian, Kai is a female (and very rarely male) name meaning "pier" or "quay".
 In Japanese, kai has a number of meanings, including "ocean" (海), "shell" (貝), "open" (開), "restoration" and "recovery".
 In Māori, kai means "food" or "meal".
In Northern Ireland, data indicated that Kai experienced a significant rise in popularity as a male given name from 2002 to 2003.
 Kai was among the five most popular names for newborn boys of Asian descent in the American state of Virginia in 2022.

Notable people with the given name "Kai" include

A
Kai Aareleid (born 1972), Estonian writer
Kai Alaerts (born 1989), Belgian skier
Kai Alexander (born 1997), British actor
Kai Altair (born 1984), American musician
Kai Althoff (born 1966), German multimedia artist
Kai Ambos (born 1965), German judge
Kai Normann Andersen (1900–1967), Danish composer
Kai Arzheimer (born 1969), German professor
Kai Asakura (born 1993), Japanese mixed martial artist
Kai Atō (1946–2015), Japanese actor

B
Kai Behrend, German mathematician
Kai Bird (born 1951), American journalist
Kai Bjorn (born 1968), Canadian sailor
Kai Böcking (born 1964), German television presenter
Kai Bracht (born 1978), German ski jumper
Kai Brodersen (born 1958), German historian
Kai Luke Brümmer (born 1993), South African actor
Kai Brünker (born 1994), German footballer
Kai Aage Bruun (1899–1971), Danish writer
Kai Budde (born 1979), German gamer
Kai Bülow (born 1986), German footballer
Kai Bumann (1961–2022), German conductor
Kai Burger (born 1992), German footballer

C
Kai Cenat (born 2001), American YouTuber
Chang Kai (born 1964), Chinese physicist
Chen Kai (born 1993), Chinese footballer
Kai Chang (born 2000), Jamaican discus thrower
Kai Cipot (born 2001), Slovenian footballer
Kai Compagner (born 1969), Dutch rower
Kai Corbett (born 2002), Spanish footballer
Kai Correa (born 1988), American baseball coach
Cui Kai (born 1982), Chinese track and field athlete
Cui Kai (footballer) (born 1987), Chinese footballer
Kai Curry-Lindahl (1917–1990), Swedish zoologist

D
Deng Kai (born 1959), Chinese politician
Kai Diekmann (born 1964), German journalist
Kai Donner (1888–1935), Finnish linguist

E
Kai Ebel (born 1964), German sports journalist
Kai Eckhardt (born 1961), German musician
Kai Edwards (born 1998), Australian swimmer
Kai Edwards (basketball) (born 1997), Dutch basketball player
Kai Eide (born 1949), Norwegian diplomat
Kai Ekanger (1929–2018), Norwegian politician
Kai Ellis (born 1980), American football player
Kai Engelke (born 1946), German writer
Kai Arne Engelstad (born 1954), Norwegian speed skater
Kai Ephron (born 1965), American film director
Kai T. Erikson (born 1931), Austrian-American sociologist
Kai Ewans (1906–1988), Dutch-American musician

F
Kai Fagaschinski (born 1974), German musician
Kai Falkenberg, American lawyer
Kai Falkenthal (born 1965), German yacht racer
Kai G. Farley (born 1973), Liberian politician
Feng Kai (born 1974), Chinese speed skater
Kai Fischer (born 1934), German actress
Kai Fjell (1907–1989), Norwegian painter
Kai Abdul Foday (1924–??), Sierra Leonean politician
Kai Forbath (born 1987), American football player
Kai Fotheringham (born 2003), Scottish footballer
Kai Frobel, German ecologist

G
Kai Gehring (born 1977), German politician
Kai Gehring (footballer) (born 1988), German footballer
Gong Kai (1222–1307), Chinese politician
Kai Greene (born 1975), American bodybuilder
Kai Greene (soccer) (born 1993), American soccer player
Kai Grjotheim (1919–2003), Norwegian chemist
Kai Gronauer (born 1986), German baseball player
Kai Gullmar (1905–1982), Swedish composer

H
Kai Haaskivi (born 1955), Finnish footballer
Kai Häfner (born 1989), German handball player
Kai Hahto (born 1973), Finnish drummer
Kai Hansen (born 1963), German musician
Kai Harada| (born 1999), Japanese rock climber
Kai Havertz (born 1999), German footballer
Kai Heerings (born 1990), Dutch footballer
Kai Helenius (born 1931), Finnish diplomat
Kai G. Henriksen (1956–2016), Norwegian businessman
Kai Herdling (born 1984), German footballer
Kai Erik Herlovsen (born 1959), Norwegian footballer
Kai Hermann (born 1938), German journalist
Kai Hesse (born 1985), German footballer
Kai Hibbard (born 1978), American activist
Kai Hirano (born 1987), Japanese footballer
Kai Hirschmann, English civil servant
Kai Ho (1859–1914), Hong Kong barrister
Kai Holm (1896–1985), Danish actor
Kai Holst (1913–1945), Norwegian activist
Kai Honasan, Filipino singer-songwriter
Kai Hormann (born 1974), German computer scientist
Kai Horstmann (born 1981), English rugby union footballer
Kai Horwitz (born 1998), Chilean skier
Kai Hospelt (born 1985), German ice hockey player
Hou Kai (born 1962), Chinese politician
Hu Kai (born 1982), Chinese sprinter
Kai Huckenbeck (born 1993), German speedway racer
Kai Huisman (born 1995), Dutch footballer
Kai Hundertmarck (born 1969), German cyclist

I
Kai Ishii (born 1993), Japanese rugby union footballer
Kai Ishizu (born 2002), Japanese footballer
Kai Ishizawa (born 1996), Japanese boxer

J
Kai Jacobs (born 1995), Antiguan footballer
Kai Jahnsson (born 1965), Finnish sport shooter
Kai Jensen (1897–1997), Danish athlete
Kai Johan Jiang (born 1965), Swedish-Chinese businessman
Kai Johansen (1940–2007), Danish footballer
Kai Johansson (born 1969), Finnish swimmer
Kai Jølver (1889–1940), Danish pentathlete
Kai Jones (born 2001), Bahamian basketball player

K
Kai Kahele (born 1974), American politician
Kai Kamaka III (born 1995), American mixed martial artist
Kai Kantola (born 1987), Finnish-American ice hockey player
Kai Kara-France (born 1993), New Zealand mixed martial artist
Kai Karsten (born 1968), German sprinter
Kai Kasiguran (born 1985), American soccer player
Kai Kazmirek (born 1991), German decathlete
Kai Kennedy (born 2002), Scottish footballer
Kai Killerud, Norwegian handball player
Kai Klefisch (born 1999), German footballer
Kai Knagenhjelm (1898–1987), Norwegian civil servant
Kai Knudsen (1903–1977), Norwegian judge
Kai Ko (born 1991), Taiwanese actor and singer
Kai Kobayashi (born 1993), Japanese racewalker
Kai A. Konrad (born 1961), German economist
Kai Koreniuk (born 1998), Dutch-American soccer player
Kai Kovaljeff (born 1985), Finnish ski jumper
Kai Aage Krarup (1915–2013), Danish equestrian
Kai Krause (born 1957), German software designer
Kai Krüger (born 1940), Norwegian jurist
Kai Kyllönen (born 1965), Finnish athlete

L
Kai Lagesen (born 1965), Norwegian footballer
Kai Langerfeld (born 1987), Canadian rower
Kai Larsen (1926–2012), Danish botanist
Kai Laukkanen (born 1975), Finnish motorcycle racer
Kai Lawonn (born 1985), German computer scientist
Kai Lee, Chinese-American scientist
Kai Lehtinen (born 1958), Finnish actor
Li Kai (born 1989), Chinese footballer
Kai Li (born 1954), Chinese-American computer scientist
Kai Li (businessman) (born 1962), Chinese-American businessman
Liang Kai (1140–1210), Chinese painter
Kai Lightner (born 1999), American climber
Kai Lindberg (1899–1985), Danish politician
Ling Kai (born 1986), Singaporean singer-songwriter
Kai Linnilä (1942–2017), Finnish editor
Liu Kai (disambiguation), multiple people
Kai Locksley (born 1996), American football player
Kai Londo (1845–1896), Sierra Leonean warrior
Kai Lossgott (born 1980), German-South African artist
Lu Kai (198–269/270), Chinese military general
Lü Kai (died 225), Chinese politician
Lu Kai (badminton) (born 1991), Chinese badminton player
Kai Luibrand (born 1994), German footballer
Kai Lykke (1625–1699), Danish noble

M
Ma Kai (born 1946), Chinese politician
Kai Mahler (born 1995), Swiss skier
Kai Matsuzaki (born 1997), Japanese footballer
Kai McKenzie-Lyle (born 1997), English footballer
Kai Meriluoto (born 2003), Finnish footballer
Kai Metov (born 1964), Russian singer-songwriter
Kai Michalke (born 1976), German footballer
Kai Miki (born 1993), Japanese footballer
Kai Møller (1859–1940), Norwegian politician
Kai Müller (born 1988), German canoeist
Kai Mykkänen (born 1979), Finnish politician

N
Kai Nacua (born 1995), American football player
Kai Nielsen (disambiguation), multiple people
Kai Niemi (born 1955), Finnish motorcycle racer
Kai Nieminen (born 1950), Finnish writer
Kai Nurminen (born 1969), Finnish ice hockey player
Kai Nürnberger (born 1966), German basketball player
Kai Nyyssönen (born 1972), Finnish footballer

O
Kai O'Donnell (born 1999), Australian rugby league footballer
Kai O'Keeffe (born 2004), English footballer
Kai Ortio (born 1965), Finnish ice hockey player
Kai Oswald (born 1977), German footballer
Kai Outa (1930–2002), Finnish weightlifter
Kai Øverland (1931–1975), Norwegian politician
Kai Owen (born 1975), Welsh actor
Kai Owen (rugby union) (born 1999), English rugby union footballer
Kai Owens (born 2004), American skier
Kai Ozaki (born 1987), Japanese skier

P
Kai Paananen (born 1954), Finnish businessman
Kai Pahlman (1935–2013), Finnish footballer
Kai Paulsen (1947–2002), Norwegian journalist
Kai Pearce-Paul (born 2001), English rugby league footballer
Kai Peterson (born 1962), German actor
Kai Pfeiffer (born 1975), German visual artist
Kai Pflaume (born 1967), German television presenter
Kai Pirttijärvi, Finnish athlete
Poh Soo Kai (born 1930), Singaporean doctor
Kai Pröger (born 1992), German footballer
Kai Puolamäki, Finnish physician

Q
Qidiao Kai, Chinese philosopher
Qin Kai (disambiguation), multiple people

R
Kai Rapsch (born 1978), German musician
Kai Rautio (born 1964), Finnish ice hockey player
Kai Remlov (born 1946), Norwegian actor
Kai Reus (born 1985), Dutch cyclist
Kai Rimmel (born 1952), Estonian politician
Kai Risholt (born 1979), Norwegian footballer
Kai Røberg (born 1973), Norwegian footballer
Kai Rossen, German chemist
Kai Rüder (born 1971), German equestrian
Kai Rüütel (born 1981), Estonian singer
Kai Ryssdal (born 1963), American radio journalist

S
Kai Sakakibara (born 1996), Australian cyclist
Kai Salomaa, Finnish-Canadian computer scientist
Kai Sasaki (born 1998), Japanese footballer
Kai Sato (born 1984), American entrepreneur
Kai Sauer (born 1967), German-Finnish diplomat
Kai Schäfer (born 1993), German badminton player
Kai Schoppitsch (born 1980), Austrian footballer
Kai Schramayer (born 1968), German wheelchair tennis player
Kai Schumacher (born 1979), German pianist
Kai Schwertfeger (born 1988), German footballer
Kai Scott (born 1970), American attorney
Kai Selvon (born 1992), Trinidadian sprinter
Kai Shibato (born 1995), Japanese footballer
Kai Siegbahn (1918–2007), Swedish physicist
Kai Simons (born 1938), Finnish professor
Kai Sjøberg (1936–1994), Norwegian footballer
Kai Smith (born 2004), Emirati cricketer
Kai Somerto (1925–1969), Finnish diplomat
Song Kai (born 1984), Chinese rower
Kai Soremekun, Canadian filmmaker
Kai Sotto (born 2002), Filipino basketball player
Kai Staats (born 1970), American filmmaker
Kai Starr (born 1964), American author
Kai Steffen (born 1961), German footballer
Kai Ove Stokkeland (born 1978), Norwegian football manager
Kai Stratznig (born 2002), Austrian footballer
Kai Strauss (born 1970), German singer
Kai Suikkanen (born 1959), Finnish ice hockey player
Sun Kai (born 1991), Chinese footballer
Kai Swoboda (born 1971), Australian canoeist
Kai Syväsalmi, Finnish ice hockey player

T
Tan Kai (born 1973), Chinese computer technician
Tang Kai (born 1996), Chinese mixed martial artist
Kai Cheng Thom, Canadian writer
Tian Kai (died 199), Chinese general
Kai Tier, Australian comedian
Kai Toews (born 1998), Japanese basketball player
Kaï Tomety (born 1974), Togolese football manager
Kai Tracid (born 1972), German disc jockey
Kai Trewin (born 2001), Australian footballer
Kai Twilfer (born 1976), German merchant

U
Kai Ueda (born 1996), Japanese baseball player

V
Kai van Hese (born 1989), Dutch footballer
Kai Verbij (born 1994), Dutch speed skater
Kai von Warburg (born 1968), German rower

W
Kai Wagner (born 1997), German footballer
Wang Kai (disambiguation), multiple people
Kai Walter (born 1973), German canoeist
Kai Warner (1926–1982), German musician
Kai Wartiainen (born 1953), Finnish architect
Kai Wegner (born 1972), German politician
Kai Wehmeier (born 1968), German-American philosopher
Kai Wessel (disambiguation), multiple people
Kai Whittaker (born 1985), German politician
Kai Widdrington (born 1995), British dancer
Kai Wiesinger (born 1966), German actor
Kai Ashante Wilson, American author
Kai Winding (1922–1983), Danish-American musician
Kai Wright, American journalist
Kai Wucherpfennig, German-American biologist
Kai Wulff (born 1949), American actor

X
Xing Kai (born 1989), Chinese footballer
Xu Kai (born 1995), Chinese actor

Y
Kai Yearn (born 2005), English footballer
Yee Seu Kai, Malaysian politician

Z
Kai Zeiglar (born 1981), American football player
Zhang Kai (born 1982), Chinese basketball player
Zhang Kai (lawyer), Chinese lawyer
Zheng Kai (born 1986), Chinese actor
Zong Kai, Chinese Paralympic athlete
Zou Kai (born 1988), Chinese gymnast

Fictional characters
Kai from Kung Fu Panda 3
Kai, a character in the computer-animated television series Ninjago
Kai, a character in the television series The White Lotus
Kai Booker, a character in the television series Being Erica
Kai Chen, a character in the television series Power Rangers Lost Galaxy.
Kai Lung, a character in an eponymous novel series written by Ernest Bramah
Kai Ozu, a character in the television series, Mahō Sentai Magiranger
Kai Samezu, a character in the television series, Hyakujuu Sentai Gaoranger.
Kai Parker, a character in the television series,  The Vampire Diaries.
·Kai Anderson, a character in the television series ''American Horror Story'

Notable people with the surname "Kai" include
Akihito Kai (born 1987), Japanese handball player
Asami Kai (born 1987), Japanese actress
Bertrand Kaï (born 1983), New Caledonian footballer
Carole Kai (born 1944), American entertainer
Dakota Kai (born 1988), New Zealand professional wrestler
Haji Kai (born 1971), Tanzanian politician
Kentaro Kai (born 1994), Japanese footballer
Konomi Kai (born 1993), Japanese long jumper
Lani Kai (1936–1999), American singer
Leilani Kai (born 1960), American professional wrestler
Marie Kai (born 1980), Japanese actress
Natasha Kai (born 1983), American soccer player
Roland B. Kai, Liberian politician
Shingo Kai (born 1963), Japanese water polo player
Shintaro Kai (born 1981), Japanese golfer
Shouma Kai (born 1997), Japanese actor
Sibo Kai, Indian politician
Takuya Kai (born 1992), Japanese baseball player
Tomomi Kai (born 1983), Japanese shogi player
Toshimitsu Kai (born 1956), Japanese golfer
Yasuhiro Kai (born 1968), Japanese judoka
Yukiko Kai (1954–1980), Japanese manga artist

See also 
Kai (disambiguation), a disambiguation page for "Kai"
Kay (disambiguation), a disambiguation page for "Kay"

References 

English unisex given names
Japanese-language surnames
Japanese masculine given names
Danish masculine given names
Estonian feminine given names
Norwegian masculine given names
Scandinavian masculine given names
Chinese masculine given names
Finnish masculine given names